Konstantin Kalinin (born 12 August 1885, date of death unknown) was a Russian Empire sports shooter. He competed in four events at the 1912 Summer Olympics.

References

1885 births
Year of death missing
Male sport shooters from the Russian Empire
Olympic competitors for the Russian Empire
Shooters at the 1912 Summer Olympics
Sportspeople from Poltava